Banseri is a village in the Khyber Pakhtunkhwa province of Pakistan. It is located at 34°9'0N 73°8'0E with an altitude of 1168 metres (3835 feet). Neighbouring settlements include Mukhdabbi, Saliot, and Baghati.

References

Villages in Khyber Pakhtunkhwa